The Botswana Construction Workers' Union (BCWU) is a trade union affiliate of the Botswana Federation of Trade Unions in Botswana.

References

Botswana Federation of Trade Unions
Building and construction trade unions
Organisations based in Gaborone
Trade unions in Botswana